Jan Kobuszewski (19 April 1934 – 28 September 2019) was a Polish actor and comedian.

Biography 
Kobuszewski graduated from the National Academy of Dramatic Art in Warsaw. He performed in many theatres, including Teatr Młodej Warszawy (1956–1957), Warsaw (1957–1958), Teatr Polski, Warsaw (1958–1964), Teatr Wielki, Warsaw (1964–1969), and Kwadrat Theatre, Warsaw (1976-now). In 1963, he began co-hosting with Jan Kociniak the first satirical TV show on Polish television, Wielokropek.

Kobuszewski was awarded the Order of Polonia Restituta, one of Poland's highest orders, and many other orders, including Gold Cross of Merit and Medal for Long Marital Life. He died on 28 September 2019, aged 85.

Private life
Kobuszewski was the husband of actress Hanna Zembrzuska. He had a daughter Maryna. He was also an uncle of the actor Wiktor Zborowski.

Filmography 

Ryś (2007) .... Ciemny
U fryzjera .... Błażej Grzegorz (1 episode, 2006)
Codzienna 2 m. 3 (2005–2007) .... Anatol
Graczykowie (1999–2000) .... Półpielec
Przygody dobrego wojaka Szwejka (1999) .... Katz
Złoto dezerterów (1998) .... Haber's Father
Klan (2 episodes, 1997) .... Photographer
Czterdziestolatek - dwadzieścia lat później (1 episode, 1993) .... Jasio
Alternatywy 4 .... Cheat (2 episodes, 1986)
5 dni z życia emeryta (1985) TV series .... Namiastka
Mrzonka (1985) (TV)
Miłość z listy przebojów (1985) .... Gustaw
Lata dwudzieste, lata trzydzieste (1984) .... Maksymilian Fuks
Miłość ci wszystko wybaczy (1981) .... Comedian Tadeusz
Cóżeś ty za pani... (1979) .... Jan Dobosz
Hallo Szpicbródka, czyli ostatni występ Króla Kasiarzy (1978) .... Plainclothes Man Mankowski
Brunet wieczorową porą (1976) .... Truck Driver
Nie ma róży bez ognia (1974) .... Postman
Czterdziestolatek .... Jasio (1 episode, 1974)
Poszukiwany - poszukiwana (1973) .... Workman
Kłopotliwy gość (1971) .... Doctor
Pogoń za Adamem (1970) .... Film distributor
Nowy (1970) .... Doctor
Zmartwychwstanie Offlanda (1968) (TV) .... Sergeant Drue
Piekło i niebo (1966) .... Screenwriter
Wojna domowa .... Plumber's Boss (1 episode, 1966)
Barbara i Jan .... Jan Buszewski, news photographer (7 episodes, 1965)
Nowy pracownik (1966) .... Doctor
Zawsze w niedzielę (1965) .... Trainer
Żona dla Australijczyka (1964) .... Dealer
Naprawdę wczoraj (1963) (uncredited) .... Waiter
Smarkula (1963) .... Taxi Driver
Złoto (1962) .... Waiter
Guests Are Coming (1962) .... 3rd Episode
Klub kawalerów (1962) .... Nieśmiałowski
Kwiecień (1961) .... Paweł
Szczęściarz Antoni (1961) .... Fijałkowski
Ostrożnie, Yeti! (1961) .... Prisoner Playing the Violin
Zamach (1959) .... Jurek
Kalosze szczęścia (1958) .... Militiaman Franek 'Wazny'
Ewa chce spać (1958) (uncredited) .... Marian
Warszawska syrena (1956) .... Fisherman
Godziny nadziei (1955)

Polish dubbing 
 Baldur's Gate (1999, computer game) .... Narrator
 Baldur's Gate II (2001, computer game) .... Jan Jansen
 Sceny z życia smoków (1994–1997)
 Film pod strasznym tytułem (1992–1994)
 O dwóch takich, co ukradli księżyc (1984–1989) .... Narrator
 Przygód kilka wróbla Ćwirka (1983–1989) .... All characters

References

External links 

 

Polish male film actors
Polish male stage actors
Polish male television actors
Commanders with Star of the Order of Polonia Restituta
1934 births
2019 deaths
Polish male voice actors
Polish cabaret performers
Polish Roman Catholics
Recipients of the Gold Cross of Merit (Poland)
Recipients of the Gold Medal for Merit to Culture – Gloria Artis
20th-century Polish male actors
Male actors from Warsaw
People from Warsaw Voivodeship (1919–1939)
Burials at Powązki Cemetery
Recipient of the Meritorious Activist of Culture badge